The city of Rusticiana was located in the Roman province of Numidia (modern Algeria and parts of Tunisia and Libya). Its location and the corresponding modern city are unknown.

Ecclesiastical history
Two bishops of the ancient diocese are known. Leonatist a donatist who took part in the Carthage conference of 411 and the Bishop Donato who was exiled by the Vandal king Huneric after he attended the synod in Carthage of 484, after which he was exiled.

The Roman Catholic titular see of Rusticiana was established in 1933. It has had six post holders, with the most recent being the current post holder Archbishop Pierre Nguyên Van Tot.

List of the Titular Bishops of Rusticiana

References

External links
Catholic-Hierarchy website: Titular see of Rusticiana

Catholic Church in Algeria